The Telangana Legislature is the state legislature of Telangana.

State legislature
The Telangana Legislature is currently bicameral.
 The lower house is called the Telangana Legislative Assembly. At present the Legislative Assembly consists of 119 Members.
 The upper house, known as the Telangana Legislative Council, has lesser powers than the Assembly and several of its members are nominated by the Assembly. Others are elected from various sections of the society like Graduates and Teachers. Currently the Legislative Council consists of 43 members.

Location

Sessions of the Legislative Assembly take place at the Legislative Assembly Building, located in Hyderabad. It was built in 1905 to mark the 40th birthday of 6th Nizam Mir Mahboob Ali Khan. This white gem of Hyderabad's architectural splendor was designed by specially commissioned architects. It adjoins the picturesque public gardens also known as the famous hanging gardens.

The Legislative Council meets at the historic Jubilee Hall, also in Hyderabad.

References

 
State legislatures of India
Bicameral legislatures